Moreton is a village in the Epping Forest district of the County of Essex, England. It is located 7.2 miles (11.6 km) east of Harlow and 3.2 miles (5.14 km) north-west of Chipping Ongar.

Two thousand years ago, it was the point at which a Roman style road, connecting Great Dunmow (Stane Street) to London, crossed the Cripsey Brook  .   Today the bridge that crosses the Cripsey is still a feature of Moreton, and although it's not two thousand years old, its construction nonetheless predates the advent of mass motorised transport.   There being no weight limits on the village lanes in this corner of Essex, this narrow bridge has become somewhat degraded over recent decades, by the passage of large trucks and of other vehicles driven with insufficient precision between its parapets.

There is no modern road, at this point, following the route of the Roman road out of the village, but the old road's route can be followed at Tawney Common a few miles to the south west. Modern Moreton remains at the confluence of various minor roads, however, which link to Fyfield, to the east, Bobbingworth to the south, High Laver (burial place of John Locke) to the west and Matching to the north.   Where the roads meet there remain several substantial village houses from the late Medieval / early modern period of English history, as well as two traditional English pubs, being The White Hart and The Nags Head.

Directly to the east of The Nags head, Moreton features a primary school, which retains its small Victorian era main building, but in recent decades has grown in size and in excellence, as schools in neighbouring villages have been closed down.

The surrounding area is agricultural. There is also a seed processing plant that is just a short distance to the north of the village, which processes cereal, pulse, and oilseed rape seeds.  Apart from that, commercial activity has largely abandoned the village, and today many residents must commute to Harlow, Loughton, Chelmsford or London.

For many years after petrol and diesel engined tractors became mainstream in England, Moreton retained a depot housing steam tractors (traction engines) but historical traction engines are no longer a feature of Moreton.

Gallery

References

External links

Epping Forest District
Villages in Essex